The iliac fossa is a large, smooth, concave surface on the internal surface of the ilium (part of the three fused bones making the hip bone).

Structure 
The iliac fossa is bounded above by the iliac crest, and below by the arcuate line. It is bordered in front and behind by the anterior and posterior borders of the ilium.

The iliac fossa gives origin to the iliacus muscle. The obturator nerve passes around the iliac fossa. It is perforated at its inner part by a nutrient canal. Below it there is a smooth, rounded border, the arcuate line, which runs anterior, inferior, and medial.

When the "left" or "right" adjective is used (e.g "right iliac fossa"), the iliac fossa usually  means one of the inguinal regions of the nine regions of the abdomen.

Additional images

See also
 Right iliac fossa

Reference 

Bones of the pelvis
Ilium (bone)